Heather Croall (born 1967) is an international arts festival CEO and Artistic Director and documentary producer, best known for leading Sheffield Doc/Fest and Adelaide Fringe, and her work on live music / archive films including  The Big Melt, From the Sea to the Land Beyond, Girt By Sea, From Scotland With Love,  Atomic, Living in Dread and Promise 

In 2020 Heather Croall won the Leadership Award at the SA Woman Awards and in 2021, Croall was nominated as Leader of the Year in the South Australian Woman of the Year Awards. In 2011 Croall was named one of Realscreen'''s annual trailblazers, and in 2013 the Alliance of Women Film Journalists named Croall Ambassador of Women's Films for the year, for her work "to boost documentary film and open opportunities for women filmmakers". In 2015 she received Sheffield Doc/Fest's Inspiration Award. In 2021 Croall was awarded the Superhero Award at the DocEdge Festival in New Zealand.

In February 2015 she left Sheffield Doc/Fest to take up the position of CEO and Artistic Director of the Adelaide Fringe, with her contract there extended until 2024.

 Early life 

Croall was born in Blackpool in 1967 and lived in Sheffield until the age of five, when her family emigrated to South Australia.
Career
In 1993 Croall set up a production company, Re Angle Pictures, to produce and direct documentaries. In 2020 she Produced and Directed a documentary about her dad and her home town of Whyalla called “Yer Old Faither” it won the audience award at Adelaide Film Festival and was selected for Glasgow Film Festival and others.  Her 1999 film Paradise Bent: Boys will be Girls in Samoa won the Silver Plaque at the Chicago International Film Festival.
She continued her career at the South Australian Film Corporation, and also produced digital and documentary strands at the Adelaide Fringe. In 2001, she developed Crossover, an organisation which works with technologists, coders, artists, performers, filmmakers, writers and more to create new interdisciplinary projects. 

From 2003 Croall worked for the Australian International Documentary Conference, where she became CEO and Festival Director and developed the MeetMarket pitching event. Croall then set up the MeetMarket at Sheffield Docfest in 2006 and it is still a central part of that festival. 

 Sheffield Doc/Fest 

In 2006 Croall was invited to become CEO and festival director at Sheffield Doc/Fest.
When she joined the festival, it was a two-day event attracting 500 delegates and 2000 public attendees. Croall widened it to a five-day event with 3000 delegates and 25,000 public attendees. She found new funding which tripled the budget in two years, and changed the date of the festival from November to June. She brought in the MeetMarket pitching forum, which in 2011 generated £5.6 million worth of business for producers. She also added year-round training and events alongside the festival.Variety magazine said Croall lifted Doc/Fest "into the premier league of international doc events".
In 2012 Croall sat on the US Documentary jury at the Sundance Film Festival, and she was on the 25th anniversary advisory committee for PBS's POV documentary series. In 2015 she was awarded Sheffield Doc/Fest's Inspiration Award.

 Adelaide Fringe 

In February 2015 Croall left Doc/Fest to become CEO and festival director of the Adelaide Fringe, with her contract extended to 2020 after two successful festivals. Her contract was extended again to 2024.  

In August 2016, under Croall's leadership, the Adelaide Fringe began an official partnership with the Edinburgh Fringe Festival.

 Filmography 

Croall has co-produced a number of films, in which directors edit together archive footage on a particular theme, soundtracked by original music.

In 2020 Croall produced and directed “Yer Old Faither” a documentary about her father who immigrated from Glasgow to the remote town of Whyalla.  The film was supported by the Adelaide Film Festival Investment Fund and Screen Australia and the South Australian Film Corporation as well as significant crowd funding through Documentary Australia Foundation. “Yer Old Faither” premiered at the  Adelaide Film Festival  where it won the Audience Award. It also screened at Glasgow Film Festival and is available on the DocPlay channel in Australia. 

In 2012 Croall  commissioned and co-produced a project at Doc/Fest especially for the festival, From the Sea to the Land Beyond. This is a documentary made up of archive footage from the British coast, directed by Penny Woolcock with an original soundtrack by British Sea Power.  In 2013 Croall co-produced  The Big Melt, a documentary by Martin Wallace and Jarvis Cocker that similarly fused original music with archive footage. It was made to celebrate 100 years of stainless steel in Sheffield, with a live soundtrack scored by Jarvis Cocker. She also followed up From the Sea to the Land Beyond with its Australian equivalent, Girt by Sea, which was made for the Perth International Arts Festival on the theme of the Australian coast. Shane McNeil directed, with music by The Panics.

For 2014 Croall co-produced three films, again fusing archive footage with new, original soundtracks. Velorama told the story of a century of the bicycle. It was commissioned to mark the arrival of the 2014 Tour de France in Yorkshire, and directed by Daisy Asquith with a soundtrack by Bill Nelson and Chumbawamba. Love Is All brought together director Kim Longinotto with Sheffield singer/songwriter Richard Hawley, formerly of Pulp, to explore the theme of love.Helen Pidd, Pulp to Scorsese: down-to-earth Sheffield Doc/Fest reaches for the stars, The Guardian, 8 June 2014, retrieved 4 August 2014 And From Scotland with Love was commissioned as part of the Cultural Festival accompanying the 2014 Commonwealth Games, directed by Virginia Heath with a soundtrack by King Creosote.

In 2015 Croall co-produced two films, both for Storyville. Atomic, Living in Dread and Promise was directed by Mark Cousins and soundtracked by Mogwai (who released the music as the album Atomic). The Show of Shows: 100 Years of Vaudeville, Circuses and Carnivals was directed by Benedikt Erlingsson with music from Sigur Rós, Hilmar Örn Hilmarsson and Kjartan Dagur Holm.
Accolades
In 2020 Heather Croall won the Leadership Award at the SA Woman Awards and in 2021, Croall was nominated as Leader of the Year in the South Australian Woman of the Year Awards.  

In 2015 Croall received Sheffield Doc/Fest's Inspiration Award. In 2021 Croall was awarded the Superhero Award at the DocEdge Festival in New Zealand. 

In 2014 Croall was awarded an Honorary Doctorate from Sheffield Hallam University. 

The Alliance of Women Film Journalists named Croall 2013's Ambassador of Women's Films for her work "to boost documentary film and open opportunities for women filmmakers", and in 2011 Croall was named a trailblazer by Realscreen.

Media appearances
She has appeared on BBC Two's The Review Show and BBC Radio 4's The Media Show''.

References

External links 
 
 

1967 births
Living people
Australian documentary film producers
People from Blackpool
English emigrants to Australia
Film festival directors
Australian women film producers
Women documentary filmmakers